Mainieri is a surname. Notable people with the surname include:

Demie Mainieri (1928–2019), American football coach
Mike Mainieri (born 1938), American jazz musician
Paul Mainieri (born 1957), American baseball player and coach